Pantip Plaza is an indoor IT shopping mall located on New Phetchaburi Road in Ratchathewi district, Bangkok, Thailand. It has branch locations in Nonthaburi, in Bangkapi, and in Chiang Mai.

Stores
The mall has two anchors, IT City, which occupies the top floor, and Data IT on the mezzanine level. There are hundreds of small shops specialising in computer hardware, software, and accessories, including repair, modifications, networking, secondhand, laptops, Macintosh and peripherals.

Hardware
Shops in Pantip Plaza offer a wide selection of new and second-hand computers from most of the major manufacturers, together with a selection of secondhand and custom equipment. Digital cameras, printers, music players, and games consoles are also available.

Food and drink
Pantip Plaza has some restaurants on the ground floor, while food courts on the mezzanine level and second floor offer a wide selection of Thai cuisine, desserts and drinks.

Other branches

Pantip Plaza 2
Pantip Plaza 2 is on Ngamwongwan Road in province of Nonthaburi.

Pantip Bangkapi
Pantip Bangkapi is on Lat Phrao Road, Bang Kapi district of Bangkok. Opened in May 2010 with 5 floors, it contains many brand name flagship stores such as Hewlett-Packard, Acer and VAIO. Although it has fewer stores than the original Pantip Plaza, it is one of the largest IT malls in the area.

Chiang Mai

In Chiang Mai, Pantip Plaza is on the corner of Chang Klan Road (Night Bazaar) and Sri Donchai Road. It also has a food court.

In popular culture
Pantip Plaza is featured in a hit song by Loso, "Pantip", which has a hook chorus, "Ja mai pai Pantip" ("จะไม่ไปพันธุ์ทิพย์" - "(I) will not go to Pantip") and is about a man dating a woman and taking her shopping at World Trade Center, MBK Center, and Siam Square, but he refuses to take her to Pantip Plaza because his ex-girlfriend works there. It is used in many governments' advertising campaigns to promote anti-infringement issues in Thailand.

References

Shopping malls in Bangkok
Ratchathewi district